Whitman Street Area Historic District is a national historic district located at Orangeburg, Orangeburg County, South Carolina. The district encompasses 12 contributing buildings in a residential section of Orangeburg. They include large, two-story frame houses constructed in the late-19th and early-20th century.  The houses are in a variety of popular architectural styles including Victorian, Queen Anne, Classical Revival, and Colonial Revival.

It was added to the National Register of Historic Places in 1985.

References

Houses on the National Register of Historic Places in South Carolina
Historic districts on the National Register of Historic Places in South Carolina
Victorian architecture in South Carolina
Queen Anne architecture in South Carolina
Neoclassical architecture in South Carolina
Colonial Revival architecture in South Carolina
Houses in Orangeburg County, South Carolina
National Register of Historic Places in Orangeburg County, South Carolina